In literature, pace, or pacing is the speed at which a story is told—not necessarily the speed at which the story takes place.  The number of words needed to write about a certain event does not depend upon how much time the event takes to happen; it depends upon how important that moment is to the story.  The pace is determined by the length of the scenes, how fast the action moves, and how quickly the reader is provided with information.  It is also sometimes dictated by the genre of the story:  comedies move faster than dramas; action adventures move faster than suspense.  A dragging pace is characteristic of many novels turned down by publishers, and of some that find their way into print but not into the hearts and recommendations of readers.  Manuscripts that move too slowly usually discourage readers from reading on.

Methods 
Storytellers have a number of writing tools at their disposal—for example, narration, action, description, and dialogue.  When considering how to pace a story, description and narration will move it along slowly, steadily, and easily, while action and dialogue will speed it up.  Of all the tools at a writer's disposal, dialogue is the one that most quickly puts the characters and the reader into the present moment, even more so than action.

Pace can be increased through:
 flipping forward past a scene that is in the story but never appears in the book
 skipping steps in a logical sequence of events
 short scenes
 frequent paragraphing
 short sentences
 dialogue
 action
 active voice and aggressive verbs
 flab-cutting (removal of superfluous words and phrases, and unnecessary adjectives and adverbs)
Pace can be decreased through:
 description and narration
 introspection

Weaving 
While dialogue is the element that brings a story and the characters to life on the page, action creates the movement, and narrative gives the story its depth and substance.  Writing a story means weaving all the elements of fiction together.  When this is done right, weaving dialogue, action, and narrative can create a beautiful tapestry.  Pacing is probably the most common fiction element to pay attention to when considering when to and when not to weave dialogue, narrative, and action.  When creating a fast-paced conflict scene between two or more people, a writer might do well to consider only dialogue, at least for parts of it.  Perhaps the characters have just entered into an argument and the writer wants to speed up the scene.  Then there are times when a scene should move slowly, so it is not always best to use dialogue.  However, reading slow-moving dialogue is preferable to reading lengthy passages of philosophical narrative.  There are scenes in all stories that work best using only narrative or only dialogue or only action. There are no definite rules about when to and when not to weave.  To weave well is to find the story's rhythm.

Variation

Within a story
A good plot is an exercise in proper balance.  By staying aware of the scenes' levels of intensity and writing accordingly, a writer can make novels fresh and memorable to their readers.  Beginning writers often give every moment in their stories the same weight.  However, in writing fiction, they are in charge of the way time moves.  They can pass quickly over what is unimportant, or even skip it entirely.  Then they can stretch out the events their readers care about.  There is a time for telling and a time for showing.  Most stories are paced not too fast, but too slowly.  On the other hand, there is nothing less exciting than non-stop excitement, so writers must avoid the monotony of constant action and texture the pace.  Writing should be done with a consciousness of pacing and tension.  In the rising action of the story, reader interest can be maintained by upping the action ante with each succeeding scene.  The initial obstacle the hero overcomes should be smaller than the one that follows.

Between different stories
Different kinds of stories call for different kinds of characters, tension, pacing, themes, and dialogue.  A fast-paced action adventure needs fast-paced dialogue in every scene to keep the story moving forward quickly.  Likewise, a literary story needs the dialogue to match the pace of the other elements in the story—it needs to move more slowly.  Genre stories generally move quickly, employing more dialogue and action and less slow-paced narrative, because they are generally plot-driven rather than character-driven, like literary and mainstream stories.  The emphasis is on the action that keeps the plot moving rather than the narrative that keeps the character growing.  It pays to know the characters because who they are determines how slowly or quickly they talk.

See also 
 Show, don't tell

Notes

References 
 
 
 
 
 
 
 
 
 
 

Fiction
Literary terminology
Narrative techniques
Narratology
Style (fiction)